Princeton Cemetery is a historic pre-Civil War cemetery in rural Dallas County, Arkansas. It is located on County Road 201, southeast of Princeton, which was the county's first seat. The oldest grave is that of William Suggs, an early settler of Princeton who died in 1849.

The cemetery was listed on the National Register of Historic Places in 1984.

See also
 National Register of Historic Places listings in Dallas County, Arkansas

References

External links
 
 

Cemeteries on the National Register of Historic Places in Arkansas
Buildings and structures in Dallas County, Arkansas
National Register of Historic Places in Dallas County, Arkansas
Cemeteries established in the 1840s